The Gord Carroll Curling Classic (formerly the Mount Lawn Gord Carroll Classic and the Village of Taunton Mills Gord Carroll Curling Classic) is an annual bonspiel, or curling tournament, that takes place at the Whitby Curling Club in Whitby, Ontario.

The tournament began as part of the men's and women's Ontario Curling Tour, and was later included in the World Curling Tour starting in 2013. In 2015, the men's event was discontinued, but brought back in 2022. It was not held in 2016 or 2020.

Past champions

Women
Only skip's name is displayed.

Men
Only skip's name is displayed.

References

Ontario Curling Tour events
Sport in Whitby, Ontario